The KwaZulu-Natal Legislature is the primary legislative body of the South African province of KwaZulu-Natal. It is unicameral in its composition and elects the premier and the provincial cabinet from among the leading party or coalition members in the parliament.

Powers
The KwaZulu-Natal Legislature chooses the Premier of KwaZulu-Natal, the head of the KwaZulu-Natal provincial executive.  The legislature can impel the Premier to resign by passing a motion of no confidence. Although the Premier appoints the members of the Executive Council (cabinet), the legislature may pass a motion of no confidence to force the Premier to reshuffle the Council. The legislature also designates the KwaZulu-Natal's delegates to the National Council of Provinces, allocating delegates to parties in proportion to the number of seats each party holds in the legislature.

The legislature has the power to pass legislation in numerous fields set out in the national constitution; in some fields, the legislative power is shared with the national parliament, while in others it is reserved to the province alone. The fields include matters as health, education (except universities), agriculture, housing, environmental protection, and development planning.

The legislature oversees the administration of the KwaZulu-Natal provincial government, and the Premier of KwaZulu-Natal and the Executive Council members are required to report to the legislature on the performance of their responsibilities. The legislature also manages the financial affairs of the provincial government by way of the appropriation bills which determine the provincial budget.

Election 
The provincial legislature consists of 80 members, who are elected through a system of party list proportional representation with closed lists. In other words, each voter casts a vote for one political party, and seats in the legislature are allocated to the parties in proportion to the number of votes received. The seats are then filled by members in accordance with lists submitted by the parties before the election.

The legislature is elected for a term of five years, unless it is dissolved early. This may occur if the legislature votes to dissolve and it is at least three years since the last election, or if the Premiership falls vacant and the legislature fails to elect a new Premier within ninety days. By convention, all nine provincial legislatures and the National Assembly are elected on the same day.

The most recent election was held on 8 May 2019. The following table summarises the results.

The following table shows the composition of the legislature after past elections and floor-crossing periods.

Officers

The Speaker of the Legislature is Ntobeko Boyce, while the Deputy Speaker is Themba Mthembu. The following people have served as Speaker:

Membership

References

External links
 KZN Legislature

Government of KwaZulu-Natal
Provincial legislatures of South Africa
Unicameral legislatures